Sun Guangyuan (1900–1979), also known as Sun Tang (孫鎕), was a Chinese mathematician.

He studied projective geometry under Ernest Preston Lane at the University of Chicago. Later Sun became a professor in Tsinghua University, Beijing.

Sun used Ernest Julius Wilczynski's expression of a ruled surface given via two linear homogeneous differential equations in a 1927 publication.

References

1900 births
1979 deaths
20th-century  Chinese mathematicians
Mathematicians from Zhejiang
Geometers
Academic staff of Tsinghua University
Academic staff of the National Central University
Academic staff of Nanjing University
Scientists from Hangzhou
Educators from Hangzhou